Roncobello is a comune (municipality) in the Province of Bergamo in the Italian region of Lombardy, located about  northeast of Milan and about  north of Bergamo.

Roncobello borders the following municipalities: Ardesio, Branzi, Dossena, Isola di Fondra, Lenna, Moio de' Calvi, Oltre il Colle, Serina.

References